Tyinda was a town of ancient Lycia, between Cyaneae and Phellus. The name is not attested in history, but is derived from epigraphic and other evidence. 

Its site is located near the modern town of Bağlıca, Asiatic Turkey.

References

Populated places in ancient Lycia
Former populated places in Turkey
Archaeological sites in Turkey